Neundorf bei Lobenstein is a village and a former municipality in the district Saale-Orla-Kreis, in Thuringia, Germany. Since 1 January 2019, it is part of the municipality Rosenthal am Rennsteig.

References

Saale-Orla-Kreis
Principality of Reuss-Gera
Former municipalities in Thuringia